Elisabetta Viviani (born 10 October 1953) is an Italian singer, actress, and TV personality.

Biography

Born in Milan in 1953, she began her career in 1962 as a child, playing small roles in the Carosellos RAI and, from the age of seven, she attended Luciana Novaro's Milanese ballet school.

At the same time, she learned to play the guitar and enrolled at the Accademia dei Filodrammatici in Milan.

At that time, he began to lend her image to a few fortunate television commercials.

But 1978 is the year of success, thanks to the anime Heidi, of which she sings the soundtrack, and which sells a million and a half copies. The song, with lyrics by Franco Migliacci, music by Christian Bruhn and chorus by Baba Yaga, was the Italian theme of the famous Japanese anime, directed by Isao Takahata, to be broadcast on RAI.

The following year, 1979, Elisabetta plays La banda dei cinque, the band from the homonym crime program for boys.

In 1981, film producer Mario Cecchi Gori proposed her a role in the hit film Asso, alongside Adriano Celentano and Edwige Fenech.

In 1982 Elisabetta will sing, for the only time, at the Sanremo Festival with the song C'è, by Balducci, reaching the sixth position.

In 1990 she began her collaboration with Fininvest.

In 2015, with singer-songwriter Dario Baldan Bembo and actor Franco Romeo, she acted a recital about the life of pope Francis with music by Baldan Bembo and with text by Adriano Bonfanti and Gigi Reggi, entitled Il primo a chiamarsi Francesco.

In 2017 she released the album Le donne della mia età (Women of my age), which contains ten new songs written and produced by Claudio Damiani.

Elisabetta Viviani is also a painter.

Personal life 

On 1 September 1977 Elisabetta became mother of her daughter Nicole, had by Gianni Rivera. In February 2007 she became a volunteer ambulance rescuer for the White Cross of Milan and she certified in October 2008 at 118. The activity will continue for 10 years until Christmas 2018.

Filmography

Discography
1995 – Semplicemente canzoni
2000 – Un tuffo nel mar Disney
2002 – Un film...una canzone
2004 – Le favole si possono cambiare
2006 – Un Natale di neve
2008 – Panta rei (tutto scorre)
2012 – Magico Natale
2013 – Favolando
2013 – Un Natale da favola
2015 – Il Natale dei bambini
2017 – Elisabetta Viviani per Donnein Quota
2017 – Le donne della mia età

Television 
 No, No, Nanette (Rai 1, 1974) 
 La donna serpente  (Rai 1, 1976, film TV)
 Il mostro turchino  (Rai 1, 1976, film TV)
 Valentina, una ragazza che ha fretta, dir. Vito Molinari (Rai 1, 1977, film TV)
 La pulce nell'orecchio de Georges Feydeau, dir. Vito Molinari (Rai 1, 1983)
 La moglie ingenua e il marito malato dir. Achille Campanile (Rai 1, 1985)
 Passioni (Rai 1, 1989)
 In crociera (Rete 4, 1999)

References

External links
 

1953 births
Anime musicians
Living people
20th-century Italian women singers
21st-century Italian women singers
Italian television personalities
Actresses from Milan
Italian film actresses
Musicians from Milan